This is a list of Japanese atomic, nuclear and radiological accidents, incidents and disasters.

List

List of plants affected by 2011 Tōhoku earthquake and tsunami
 Onagawa Nuclear Power Plant
 Higashidōri Nuclear Power Plant
 Tōkai Nuclear Power Plant
 Tsuruga Nuclear Power Plant
 Rokkasho Reprocessing Plant

See also
 Nuclear power in Japan
 List of civilian nuclear accidents
 List of civilian nuclear incidents
 List of civilian radiation accidents
 List of military nuclear accidents

References

Nuclear accidents and incidents
Nuclear history of Japan
Nuclear
Nuclear technology-related lists
Nuclear